The Central District of Marvdasht County is a district (bakhsh) in Marvdasht County, Fars Province, Iran. At the 2006 census, its population was 195,450, in 46,300 families.  The District has one city: Marvdasht. The District has six rural districts (dehestan): Kenareh Rural District, Majdabad Rural District, Mohammadabad Rural District, Naqsh-e Rostam Rural District, Ramjerd-e Yek Rural District, and Rudbal Rural District.

References 

Marvdasht County
Districts of Fars Province